The 2010 Arizona Wildcats baseball team represented the University of Arizona during the 2010 NCAA Division I baseball season. The Wildcats played their home games at Jerry Kindall Field at Frank Sancet Stadium. The team was coached by Andy Lopez in his 9th season at Arizona.

Previous season 
The Wildcats finished the 2009 season with a record of 30-25 (13-14 Conf.), missing the postseason for the first time since 2006 and only the 3rd time in Andy Lopez's tenure.

Personnel

Roster

Coaches

Opening day

Schedule and results

Fort Worth Regional

2010 MLB Draft

References 

Arizona
Arizona Wildcats baseball seasons
Arizona baseball